Peniculisa is a genus of marine parasitic copepods in the family Pennellidae.

Biology
Organisms from this genus are often found attached to the bodies and fins of fishes in the South Pacific and Indian oceans. Individual fishes have been reported to harbor hundreds of Peniculisa wilsoni parasites. Infection intensity is rarely cited for other Peniculisa species. Peniculisa parasitic infections tend to be limited to tetraodontiform and pomacentrid fishes.

Taxonomy
There are nine recognized species of Peniculisa:
Peniculisa bellwoodi Boxshall, 1989 – parasite of Pomacentrus amboinensis
Peniculisa bicaudata Shiino, 1956
Peniculisa crassa Uyeno & Nagasawa, 2010 – parasite of Lactoria fornasini
Peniculisa elongata Uyeno & Nagasawa, 2010 – parasite of Ostracion cubicus
Peniculisa furcata Krøyer, 1863 – parasite of Paramonacanthus barnardi
Peniculisa ohirugi Uyeno & Nagasawa, 2010 – parasite of Pomacentrus nagasakiensis
Peniculisa shiinoi Izawa, 1965 – parasite of Canthigaster rivulata
Peniculisa uchinah Uyeno & Nagasawa, 2010 – parasite of Sufflamen fraenatum, Balistoides conspicillum, Rhinecanthus aculeatus, Sufflamen bursa, Sufflamen chrysopterum and Pervagor melanocephalus
Peniculisa wilsoni Radhakrishnan, 1977 – parasite of Diodon hystrix, Arothron immaculatus, Arothron hispidus and Diodon holocanthus

References

Siphonostomatoida
Copepod genera
Animal parasites of fish